7 NADEs is the debut album by violinist/multi-instrumentalist Eyvind Kang which was released in 1996 on John Zorn's Tzadik Records as part of the Composer Series.

Reception

Allmusic music critic Stacia Proefrock wrote:

Track listing 
All compositions by Eyvind Kang
 "Theme from 1st Nade" - 3:01 		
 "Angel With Wings Torn Off" - 3:23 		
 "Earth" - 2:17 		
 "Thin, Rabid, Pearly Tunnel" - 4:45 		
 "Inevitability/The Engagement" - 1:35 		
 "Winged Head over Troubled Waters" - 5:00 		
 "5th Nade/Invisible Man" - 7:40 		
 "Universal" - 7:55
 "Theme from 6th Nade" - 1:45 		
 "Extra Cry" - 2:40
 "The Banishment" - 2:58
 "Living Corpses" - 2:14

Personnel 
Eyvind Kang - violin, keyboards, piano, bass, erhu, harp, cymbal, tape manipulations, microphone, noises, voice
Brian Fairbanks (track 9), Susanna Knapp (tracks 1 & 5) - flute 
Thuc Ngyen - clarinet (track 9)
Craig Flory, Jessica Lurie - alto saxophone (track 7)
Mike Anderson (tracks 1 & 5), Angelina Baldoz (track 11) - trumpet 
Steve Moore - trombone (track 5)
Don Ankney - French horn (track 6 & 9)
Scott Perry - oboe (track 6 & 9)
Nancy Bondurant - bassoon (track 6 & 9)
Terry Hsu, Alan Kestle - violin (tracks 1 & 5)
Brent Arnold - cello (tracks 1, 5 & 11)
Tim Young - guitar, amplifier, voice (tracks 1, 2, 4 & 5)
Mr. Ko - guitar, keyboards (track 4 & 10)
Byron Au Yong - harpsichord (tracks 1 & 5)
Craig Flory - Moog synthesizer, acoustic guitar (track 4)
Christina Schinkei - electronics (track 2)
David Slusser - slussomatic (track 4)
Scott Colburn - tape splice (track 4)
Scott Colburn - tape manipulations, fire (track 6 & 8)
Ian Rashkin (tracks 1 & 5), Geoffrey Harper (track 7), Tari Nelson-Zagar (track 7) - bass
Reggie Watts - drum machine (track 7)
Jarrad Kaplan - midi drums (track 12)
Mike Stone - percussion (track 5)
Yoko Murao - narration (track 11)
Teresa Truax - French narration (tracks 1 & 5)
Courtney Agguire (tracks 1, 5), Crystal (track 5), Jasmine (track 5), Angela Lopes (track 2),  Brad Mowen (track 10), Mari Murao (track 4), Om (track 7) - voice

References 

1996 albums
Tzadik Records albums
Eyvind Kang albums